The 2015 Australian Football League draft consisted of the various periods where the 18 clubs in the Australian Football League (AFL) can trade and recruit players following the completion of the 2015 AFL season. Additions to each club's playing list are not allowed at any other time during the year.

The key dates for the trading and drafting periods were:
Academy players to be nominated by 15 September. With a bidding process held on 24 November along with father–son selections during the national draft.
The free agency offer period; held between 9 October and 18 October. Three further free agency periods are held for delisted players, between 31 October and 9 November, 11 November to 20 November, and 25 November to 26 November.
The trade period; held between 12 October and 22 October.
The 2015 national draft; held on 24 November at the Adelaide Convention Centre, which, for the first time, included live bidding for academy and father-son selections.
The 2016 pre-season draft; which was to be held on 27 November, but was cancelled when all clubs declined to take part, and
The 2016 rookie draft; which was held on 27 November.

Additionally, following the guilty verdicts handed down to 34 past and present Essendon players in January 2016 for doping violations, Essendon was given the opportunity to recruit top-up players between January and March 2016.

Player movements

Free agency

The initial list of free agents, published in March 2015, consisted of 74 unrestricted and restricted free agents, however, 35 of those players re-signed and 15 retired during or after the home-and-away season.

Trades

For the first time, clubs were allowed to trade future selections from the next year's draft as well as the current draft. Geelong became the first AFL club to trade a future draft pick on 14 October 2015 when they traded their 2016 first round pick to Carlton for Lachie Henderson.

Note 
The numbering of the draft picks in this list may be different from the agreed draft picks at the time of the trade, due to adjustments from either the insertion of free agency compensation draft picks or clubs exiting the draft before later rounds.

Retirements and delistings

2015 national draft
The 2015 AFL national draft was held on 24 November 2015 at the Adelaide Convention Centre. For the first time, live bidding occurred during the draft for selections made under the father–son rule and from the northern state's development academies, whereby each draft selection is allocated a points value. Clubs nominating a player were forced to use their existing draft selections to match the points value of the pick used by the club bidding for the player.

Final draft order

 Notes
 Compensation picks are selections in addition to the normal order of selection, allocated to clubs by the AFL as compensation for losing uncontracted players to the new expansion clubs, Gold Coast and Greater Western Sydney.  The picks can be held for up to five years and clubs declare at the beginning of the season of their intent to utilise the pick at the end of the season.  Picks could be traded to other clubs in return for players or other draft selections.
 Free agency compensation picks are additional selections awarded to teams based on their net loss of players during the free agency trade period.
 Academy players are local zone selections available to the four NSW and Queensland clubs. Both academy and father-son selections are subject to a bidding process, where the club with the family or academy connection must match any opposition club's bid with their next available selection.

Rookie elevations
Clubs were able to promote any player who was listed on their rookie list in 2015 to their 2016 primary playing list prior to the draft. In total, 14 players were promoted.

2016 rookie draft
The 2016 AFL rookie draft was held on 27 November 2015. The official rookie draft order was released on 26 November and each club, with the exception of  who are still operating with an expanded list, can have between four and six players on their rookie list, as long as they have a maximum of 44 players on their combined primary and rookie lists.

The pre-season draft was not held as all eligible clubs informed the AFL they would not be participating.

Player breakdown
A total of 134 players were drafted across the national and rookie drafts. The following is a breakdown of players drafted by position and the league they were drafted from:

Defender – 16
Half-back – 14
Midfielder – 49
Half-forward – 22
Forward – 19
Ruckman – 10
Utility – 3

The TAC Cup was the league with the highest number of players drafted, with forty-five in total. The Dandenong Stingrays in the TAC Cup had the most players drafted out of any team with seven players.

Essendon top-up signings

On 12 January 2016, thirty-four past and present Essendon Football Club players – twelve of whom were still on the Essendon list – were suspended until November 2016 after being found guilty of being injected with the banned substance thymosin beta-4 during the 2012 season, significantly compromising Essendon's playing list for 2016. The club received permission to augment its list by recruiting up to ten top-up players from lower levels on contracts which would last until 31 October 2016. The club was limited to players who had been on an AFL list in either 2014 or 2015, with no more than one player to be taken from any state-level club; or, it could recruit any VFL-listed player from its own reserves team without restriction.

References 

Australian Football League draft
Draft
AFL Draft
AFL Draft
2010s in Adelaide
Australian rules football in South Australia
Sport in Adelaide
Events in Adelaide